Hyboptera is a genus of ground beetles in the family Carabidae.

Species
Hyboptera contains the following fourteen species:
Hyboptera angulicollis Chaudoir, 1872
Hyboptera apollonia Erwin, 2004
Hyboptera auxiliadora Erwin, 2004
Hyboptera biolat Erwin & Henry, 2017
Hyboptera dilutior Oberthür, 1884
Hyboptera lucida Henry & Erwin, 2017
Hyboptera scheelea Erwin & Henry, 2017
Hyboptera shasta Erwin, 2017
Hyboptera tepui Erwin & Henry, 2017
Hyboptera tiputini Erwin & Henry, 2017
Hyboptera tuberculata (Dejean, 1825)
Hyboptera verrucosa (Reiche, 1842)
Hyboptera vestiverdis Henry & Erwin, 2017
Hyboptera viridivittis Chaudoir, 1872

References

Lebiinae